1994–95 Amateur championship of Ukraine was the third amateur championship of Ukraine and the 31st since the establishment of championship among fitness clubs (KFK) in 1964. The format of competitions was preserved as in the Soviet competitions where there was six independent groups split by regional principal. A record of 91 teams participated in competitions.

Teams

Location map

Composition

Group 1

Group 2

Group 3

Notes
 FC Skhid Slavutych was promoted during the season and replaced FC Transimpeks Vyshneve.

Group 4

Group 5

Group 6

Promotion
For the next season the Third League was discontinued and teams were promoted to Second League which was expanded and contained couple of independent groups designed by geographic principle.

To the 1995–96 Ukrainian Second League were promoted all six group winners FC Khimik Kalush, FC Haray Zhovkva, FC Obolon-Zmina Kyiv, FC Dynamo Sloviansk, FC Portovyk Illichivsk, FC Sportinvest Kryvyi Rih.

In addition to the group winners to the professional competitions were admitted FC Skhid Slavutych which replaced bankrupted Transimpeks during the current season, Olimpiya FC AES Yuzhnoukrainsk was merged with Artania under the same name Olimpiya FC AES Yuzhnoukrainsk, FC Dynamo Odesa replaced Chornomorets-2, Kosmos Pavlohrad was merged with FC Shakhtar Pavlohrad. Promotion was also granted to three more teams FC Hirnyk Komsomolsk, FC Shakhtar Sverdlovsk, and FC Prometei Dniprodzerzhynsk.

External links
 Information on the competition

Ukrainian Football Amateur League seasons
5